The Embassy of the State of Palestine in Jordan is the diplomatic mission of the Palestine in Jordan. It is located in Amman.

See also

List of diplomatic missions in Jordan.
List of diplomatic missions of Palestine.

References

Diplomatic missions of the State of Palestine
Diplomatic missions in Jordan
Jordan–State of Palestine relations